The Cactus Café is a live music venue and bar on the campus of The University of Texas at Austin. Located in Austin, Texas, a city frequently referred to as "the live music capital of the world," a number of well-known artists have played in the Cactus, and Billboard Magazine named it as one of fifteen "solidly respected, savvy clubs" in the United States, "from which careers can be cut, that work with proven names and new faces."

Overview

The Cactus Café, which opened in 1979, is located in the Union Building, a Great Depression-era building constructed using New Deal funds. The Café is a fairly intimate venue, known for its acoustics.

In 2010, the university announced that the Cactus Café would be closing. The decision was met with widespread shock and opposition in the Austin community, from musicians, and among students.

Artists
A wide array of well-known artists played at the Cactus Café, many earlier in their careers. Lyle Lovett told the Austin Chronicle, "For a long time, the Cactus Café was the only place I played in Austin."

Notable Texans that have played at the Cafe include:
 Singer/songwriters
 Danny Barnes
 Guy Clark
 Hayes Carll
 Joe Ely
 Alejandro Escovedo
 Jimmie Dale Gilmore
 Butch Hancock
 Robert Earl Keen
 Bob Schneider
 Townes Van Zandt
 Jerry Jeff Walker
 Don Walser
 T-Bone Burnett
 Darden Smith
 Bands
 Asylum Street Spankers
 Bad Livers
 Dixie Chicks
 The Flatlanders
 Okkervil River
 Shearwater

Notable national and international artists that have played at the Cafe include:
 Singer/songwriters
 Brandi Carlile 
 Peter Case
 Ani DiFranco
 Kristin Hersh
 Paul Kelly
 Alison Krauss
 Bob Mould
 Jason Mraz
 Sharon Shannon
 Todd Snider
 Loudon Wainwright III
 Ron Sexsmith
 Milla Jovovich
 Bands
 Battlefield Band
 Black Crowes
 Nickel Creek
 Everything But the Girl

Threatened closing and controversy
In a press release on 30 January 2009, the university announced that the Cactus Café would be closing, and cited student leaders on the Texas Union Board as the decision-makers.

Members of the Austin community formed a non-profit, Friends of the Cactus Café, to attempt to save the venue. An arrangement was eventually made to keep the venue open under the auspices and management of the University of Texas operated public radio station KUT.

References

External links
 Cactus Café Bar  The Texas Union official page for the bar.
 Cactus Café Music  Calendar and Ticketing managed by KUT – University of Texas.
 Cactus Café (Facebook Account; Information on recent and future events).

Music venues in Austin, Texas
University of Texas at Austin campus